Artur Społowicz (born 11 October 1963) is a Polish equestrian. He competed at the 1996 Summer Olympics and the 2008 Summer Olympics.

References

1963 births
Living people
Polish male equestrians
Olympic equestrians of Poland
Equestrians at the 1996 Summer Olympics
Equestrians at the 2008 Summer Olympics
Sportspeople from Wrocław